Naomi Ityi (born 1928) is an Inuit artist. Ityi was born in the Garry Lake area of the Nunavut. She is known for her collaged wall hangings made from wool scraps. Her sister Martha Qarliksaq is also an artist. 

Her work is included in the collections of the National Gallery of Canada, the Museum of Fine Arts, Boston, the Museum of Anthropology at the University of British Columbia, and the Winnipeg Art Gallery.

References

1928 births
Living people
20th-century Canadian artists
20th-century Canadian women artists
21st-century Canadian artists

Inuit artists
Artists from Nunavut
Canadian textile artists
20th-century women textile artists
20th-century textile artists
21st-century Canadian women artists